Jupe may refer to:

Arts and entertainment
 Le Jupe, a character in the 1718 comedy play The Coquet
 Sissy Jupe, a character in Dickens's Hard Times

People
 Noah Jupe (born 2005), English actor
 Walter Jupé (1916–1985), German actor and screenwriter
 Jupe Karhu, member of the Finnish metal band Rifftera
 Julia Perez (1980–2017), known as Jupe, Indonesian actress, singer and businesswoman

Other uses
 Jupe (clothing), a loose-fitting wool jacket or tunic for men, and later an item of women's and children's clothing
 Jupe (IRC), a term used in Internet Relay Chat networks
 Jupe, a flat-packed housing business of Jeff Wilson
 Jupes, a division of the Comanche tribe

See also

 Alain Juppé (born 1945), French politician, Prime Minister of France from 1995 to 1997